J. Peter Stout (June 1, 1923 – September 10, 1996) was an American football fullback in the National Football League for the Washington Redskins.  Born in Throckmorton, Texas, he played college football at the University of North Texas and Texas Christian University. He was drafted in the fifth round of the 1946 NFL Draft by the New York Giants.

References

1923 births
1996 deaths
American football fullbacks
North Texas Mean Green football players
TCU Horned Frogs football players
Texas–Arlington Mavericks football players
Washington Redskins players
People from Throckmorton, Texas
Players of American football from Texas